Manistee (YTB‑782) is a United States Navy  named for Manistee, Michigan. She is the second tug to bear the name.

Construction

The contract for Manistee was awarded 14 January 1965. She was laid down on 9 August 1965 at Marinette, Wisconsin, by Marinette Marine and launched 20 October 1965.

Operational history
On 23 November 1965, Manistee, in company with another newly constructed tug, departed the builder's yard for delivery to the Naval Station San Diego, California, where she was placed in service in June. Manistee, fitted with special fenders to allow work with the Navy's newer round-hulled nuclear power submarines, remained in the 11th Naval District, assisting larger Navy ships in docking and performing general towing services into the 1990s.

Sometime before 1999, Manistee was transferred to Naval Station Yokosuka, Japan where she remains in active status.

References

External links
 

Natick-class large harbor tugs
Ships built by Marinette Marine
1965 ships